John Harold Whisenant Jr. (born June 18, 1945) is an American former head coach for the Sacramento Monarchs and New York Liberty in the Women's National Basketball Association (WNBA).

Coaching career
After starting at Connors Junior College in Warner, Oklahoma, Whisenant transferred to New Mexico State University in 1963 and played two seasons, including a senior season leading the team at 13.1 points per game.

Whisenant began his coaching career as an assistant coach at Coffeyville Community College in 1966; Coffeyville went 48–10 in his two years on staff. From 1968 to 1972, Whisenant was head coach at Arizona Western Junior College and led the school to three league championships and a cumulative 97–30 record.

From 1972 to 1979, Whisenant was an assistant coach at New Mexico under Norm Ellenberger and helped New Mexico accumulate a record of 137–62 and two WAC championships.

Whisenant began a business career focusing on real estate and horse racing after leaving the New Mexico coaching staff. He also coached his son's AAU team in Albuquerque and had a cumulative 176–16 record.

From 1999 to 2001, Whisenant was head coach and vice president of basketball operations for the New Mexico Slam of the International Basketball League. The Slam went 51–35 in its two seasons of existence, including 38–26 in 1999–2000.

After his stint with the Monarchs, Whisenant was coach and GM for the New York Liberty.  On October 25, 2012, the Liberty announced that Whisenant would be leaving the team.

Outside of coaching, Whisenant is a partner in a commercial real estate firm in Albuquerque, New Mexico.

References

 

1945 births
American men's basketball coaches
American men's basketball players
American women's basketball coaches
basketball coaches from Oklahoma
basketball players from Oklahoma
Coffeyville Red Ravens men's basketball players
Connors State Cowboys basketball players
junior college men's basketball coaches in the United States
living people
New Mexico Lobos men's basketball coaches
New Mexico State Aggies men's basketball players
New York Liberty head coaches
people from Gore, Oklahoma
Pittsburg State University alumni
Sacramento Monarchs coaches
Women's National Basketball Association championship-winning head coaches
Women's National Basketball Association executives
Women's National Basketball Association general managers